This is a list of list of buildings and nonbuilding structures.

By type 

 List of abbeys and priories
 List of amphitheatres (contemporary)
 List of amphitheatres (Roman)
 List of ancient Greek theatres
 List of ancient pyramids
List of Egyptian pyramids
 List of ancient spiral stairs
 List of ancient temple structures
List of Ancient Greek temples
List of Ancient Roman temples
 List of ancient watermills
 List of aquaria
 List of aqueducts
List of Roman aqueducts by date
List of aqueducts in the city of Rome
List of aqueducts in the Roman Empire
 List of archaeological sites sorted by country
 List of association football stadiums by capacity
 List of basilicas
List of Roman basilicas
 List of bridges
List of Roman bridges
 List of Buddhist temples
 List of casinos
 List of castles
 List of cathedrals
 List of churches
Lists of clubhouses
List of Ancient Order of United Workmen buildings
List of American Legion buildings
List of Czech-Slovak Protective Society buildings)
List of traditional gentlemen's and working men's club buildings
List of Elks buildings
List of Fraternal Order of Eagles buildings
List of Grange Hall buildings
List of Hibernian buildings
List of Knights of Columbus buildings
List of Knights of Pythias buildings
List of Masonic buildings
List of Odd Fellows buildings
List of Sons of Norway buildings
List of women's clubs
List of Woodmen of the World buildings
List of YMCA buildings
List of YWCA buildings
List of Z.C.B.J. buildings
 List of concert halls
 List of dams
List of Roman dams and reservoirs
 List of domes
List of Roman domes
 List of fortifications
 List of forts
 List of Hindu temples
 List of historic houses
List of hotels
 List of hospitals
 List of indoor arenas
 List of Jain temples
 List of jazz clubs
 List of legislative buildings
 List of lighthouses
 List of Major League Baseball stadiums
 List of masts
 List of mosques
 List of museums
 List of nuclear reactors
 List of observatories
 List of opera houses
 List of palaces
 List of pioneering solar buildings
 List of prisons
 List of Roman public baths
 List of Roman theatres
 List of Roman triumphal arches
 List of shrines
 List of stadiums
List of sugar refineries
 List of synagogues
 List of temples of The Church of Jesus Christ of Latter-day Saints
 List of towers
 List of walls
 List of windmills
 List of zoos
 Listed buildings

By age 
List of oldest buildings
List of oldest buildings in Canada
List of oldest structures in Toronto
List of oldest buildings in Britain
List of oldest buildings in Scotland
List of oldest buildings in United States of America

By region 

List of Ahmadiyya buildings and structures
List of buildings and structures in the Australian Capital Territory
List of buildings and structures in Benin
List of buildings and structures in Burundi
List of buildings and structures in Cape Verde
List of buildings and structures in the Central African Republic
List of buildings and structures in Chad
List of buildings and structures in Como
List of buildings and structures in the Comoros
List of buildings and structures in Cusco
List of buildings and structures in Djibouti
List of buildings and structures in Eritrea
List of buildings and structures in Florence
List of buildings and structures in Gabon
List of buildings and structures in the Gambia
List of buildings and structures in Guinea
List of buildings and structures in Guinea-Bissau
List of buildings and structures in Hong Kong
List of buildings and structures in Libya
List of buildings and structures in Mali
List of buildings and structures in Namibia
List of buildings and structures in Niger
List of buildings and structures in Puerto Rico
List of buildings and structures in Santiago, Cape Verde
List of buildings and structures in São Tomé and Príncipe
List of buildings and structures in São Vicente, Cape Verde
List of buildings and structures in Singapore
List of buildings and structures in Saint Petersburg
List of buildings and structures in Swansea
List of buildings and structures in Venice
List of buildings in and around Copenhagen
List of buildings in Belgrade
List of buildings in Bucharest
List of buildings in Cairo
List of buildings in Dubai
List of buildings in Ireland
List of buildings in Laredo, Texas
List of buildings in Milan
List of buildings in Ottawa
List of notable Puerto Rican buildings and structures
List of structures in London

By size 

List of largest wastewater treatment plants
List of oil refineries
List of largest hotels
List of largest hospital campuses
Shopping mall
List of largest buildings
List of largest art museums
List of largest church buildings
World's largest palace
List of longest buildings
List of tallest ancient structures
List of tallest buildings
List of future tallest buildings
List of tallest buildings in the world by continent
List of tallest buildings in Adelaide
List of tallest buildings in Albuquerque
List of tallest buildings in Argentina
List of tallest buildings in Atlanta
List of tallest buildings in Auckland
List of tallest buildings in Australia
List of tallest buildings in Bellevue, Washington
List of tallest buildings in Bolivia
List of tallest buildings in Boston
List of tallest buildings in Brazil
List of tallest buildings in Brisbane
List of tallest buildings in Buenos Aires
List of tallest buildings in Buffalo
List of tallest buildings in Calgary
List of tallest buildings in Canada
List of tallest buildings in Cartagena
List of tallest buildings in Chicago
List of tallest buildings in Cleveland
List of tallest buildings in Colombia
List of tallest buildings in Dallas
List of tallest buildings in Dayton, Ohio
List of tallest buildings in Detroit
List of tallest buildings in Edmonton
List of tallest buildings in Europe
List of tallest buildings in Finland
List of tallest buildings in Halifax
List of tallest buildings in Hobart
List of tallest buildings in Hong Kong
List of tallest buildings in Houston
List of tallest buildings in India
List of tallest buildings in Indonesia
List of tallest buildings in Iran
List of tallest buildings in Istanbul
List of tallest buildings in Jacksonville
List of tallest buildings in Kansas City
List of tallest buildings in Las Vegas
List of tallest buildings in Lithuania
List of tallest buildings in Los Angeles
List of tallest buildings in Malaysia
List of tallest buildings in Melbourne
List of tallest buildings in Miami
List of tallest buildings in Miami Beach
List of tallest buildings in Minneapolis
List of tallest buildings in Missoula
List of tallest buildings in Montreal
List of tallest buildings in Moscow
List of tallest buildings in Nagoya
List of tallest buildings in Nashville
List of tallest buildings in New Orleans
List of tallest buildings in New York City
List of tallest buildings in Oakland
List of tallest buildings in Ottawa-Gatineau
List of tallest buildings in Pakistan
List of tallest buildings in Perth
List of tallest buildings in Philadelphia
List of tallest buildings in the Philippines
List of tallest buildings in Pittsburgh
List of tallest buildings in Poland
List of tallest buildings in Providence
List of tallest buildings in Sacramento
List of tallest buildings in San Diego
List of tallest buildings in San Francisco
List of tallest buildings in Seattle
List of tallest buildings in Singapore
List of tallest buildings in Sri Lanka
List of tallest buildings in South America
List of tallest buildings in Sydney
List of tallest buildings in Taiwan
List of tallest buildings in Texas
List of tallest buildings in Toronto
List of tallest buildings in Turkey
List of tallest buildings in the United States
List of tallest buildings in Vancouver
List of tallest buildings in Vietnam
List of tallest buildings in Winnipeg
List of tallest churches in the world
List of tallest wooden buildings
List of tallest buildings and structures
List of tallest buildings and structures in the world by country
List of tallest buildings and structures in Australia
List of tallest buildings and structures in Austria
List of tallest buildings and structures in Birmingham
List of tallest buildings and structures in Canada
List of tallest buildings and structures in Great Britain
List of tallest buildings and structures in Hungary
List of tallest buildings and structures in Ireland
List of tallest buildings and structures in Israel
List of tallest buildings and structures in Japan
List of tallest buildings and structures in London
List of tallest buildings and structures in Manchester
List of tallest buildings and structures in the Paris region
List of tallest buildings and structures in Portugal
List of tallest buildings and structures in the former Soviet Union
List of visionary tall buildings and structures
List of tallest structures in the world
List of tallest structures in the world by type of use
List of tallest structures in Austria
List of tallest structures in Belgium
List of tallest structures in Bulgaria
List of tallest structures in China
List of tallest structures in Denmark
List of tallest structures in Europe
List of tallest structures in Finland
List of tallest structures in France
List of tallest structures in Germany
List of tallest structures in Hungary
List of tallest structures in Iceland
List of tallest structures in Indonesia
List of tallest structures in Japan
List of tallest structures in Luxembourg
List of tallest structures in Norway
List of tallest structures in Poland
List of tallest structures in Slovakia
List of tallest structures in Spain
List of tallest structures in Sweden
List of tallest structures in Switzerland
List of tallest structures in the Commonwealth of Nations
List of tallest structures in the Czech Republic
List of tallest structures in the Netherlands
List of tallest structures in the United States

By architect

 List of buildings by Friedensreich Hundertwasser
 List of buildings by Frank Pierce Milburn
 List of buildings by Francis Petre
 List of Le Corbusier buildings
 List of Gaudí buildings
 List of Oscar Niemeyer works
 List of Jean Nouvel works
 List of I. M. Pei projects
 List of Frank Lloyd Wright works
 List of works by Norman Foster
 List of works by Frank Gehry
 List of works by Charles Holden
 List of works by Edwin Lutyens
 List of works by César Pelli
 List of works by Renzo Piano
 List of works by Rafael Viñoly
 List of works by Minoru Yamasaki

By building material
 List of Brick Gothic buildings
 List of Brick Romanesque buildings
 List of cobblestone buildings

Other
 List of works similar to the 2020 Utah monolith
 List of bizarre buildings
 List of buildings and structures illustrated on banknotes
 List of most expensive buildings
 List of octagonal buildings and structures
 List of twisted buildings
 List of visionary tall buildings and structures

See also 

 World Heritage Site

External links
International Architecture database - archINFORM
great building collection with 3D massing model for free